Ashok Gandotra  (born 24 November 1948) is a former Indian cricketer who played in two Test matches in 1969.

Gandotra was born in Brazil where his father was posted in foreign services, while the family was from Delhi. He played domestically for Delhi and Bengal.

See also
 List of Test cricketers born in non-Test playing nations

References

External links 

1948 births
Living people
India Test cricketers
Indian cricketers
North Zone cricketers
East Zone cricketers
Delhi cricketers
Bengal cricketers
Indian Universities cricketers
People from Rio de Janeiro (city)
Cricketers from Delhi